George Edward Lowe (born November 10, 1957) is an American voice actor and comedian whose voice roles include Space Ghost on the animated series Space Ghost Coast to Coast and its spin-off, Cartoon Planet. He continued to voice Space Ghost in several cameos in other programs for several years following the conclusion of the series.

Lowe has made recurring voice appearances on Aqua Teen Hunger Force and Robot Chicken.

Early life
Born in Dunedin, Florida, Lowe grew up in nearby Brooksville. At age 15, Lowe got his first radio job with local station WWJB. He graduated from Hernando High School in 1975 and attended the Radio Engineering Institute of Sarasota and Pasco–Hernando Community College.

Career

Space Ghost
Lowe did occasional voice-over work for TBS throughout the late 1980s and early 1990s, as well as occasional voice-overs for Cartoon Network in the mid 1990s. Lowe's career as a voice actor officially began in 1994 with the premiere of Space Ghost Coast to Coast, in which he starred as the lead role of Space Ghost. Space Ghost Coast to Coast finished a ten-year run of new episodes on Cartoon Network/Adult Swim in 2004, and was revived on GameTap for 2 seasons during 2006–2008 for an additional 16 episodes.

Lowe has performed Space Ghost's voice more than any other role in his acting career, and he has portrayed the character more often than any other actor.  (Gary Owens is second and Andy Merrill is third.) In addition to Space Ghost Coast to Coast and its spin-off program Cartoon Planet, Lowe has made appearances as Space Ghost in Aqua Teen Hunger Force Colon Movie Film for Theaters, The Brak Show (he was also a series regular, providing the voice for Dad), Robot Chicken (among various other characters), Perfect Hair Forever, and other Adult Swim series.  As Space Ghost, Lowe has served as the voice of the Cartoon Network's merchandise phone sales line.

Lowe performed live and in costume as Space Ghost during the Aqua Teen Hunger Force Colon Movie Film for Theaters premiere webcast for Adult Swim; it can also be found among the extras of the Aqua Teen Hunger Force Volume Five DVD set. Lowe reprised his role as Space Ghost in the 2011 game Cartoon Network: Punch Time Explosion (where Space Ghost is the announcer), but did not in the 2012 revival of Cartoon Planet.

Other roles

Lowe recorded dialog for the film Radioland Murders, produced by George Lucas, but his scenes were cut from the final film. Lowe appeared as Dick, the chief executive officer of the fictional Bebop Cola company, in a live-action segment of the Sealab 2021 episode "All That Jazz." He also plays the recurring character of himself on Aqua Teen Hunger Force, in which he has a different occupation in every episode; he also played the character "Jet Chicken" on the show.  Lowe also provides voices on multiple episodes of Robot Chicken, his most well-known role being the recurring perverted Unicorn.

Lowe is a recurring character in Artix Entertainment games. Lowe made a special guest voice appearance in the online games AdventureQuest Worlds and Mech Quest for their Friday 13th events in August 2010, in which he takes the role of a park ranger who tells stories around campfires – but is eventually revealed to be a spirit that feeds off of fear. Lowe further appears in Mech Quest as GLaDERP, a parody of GLaDOS from Portal. Lowe narrated the AQW second year birthday event, and also made a special guest voice appearance in the online game DragonFable for the Falconreach Idle event in November 2010; he voiced himself in a panel of three judges for the event. In December 2010, as part of the game's one year anniversary event, George Lowe, as himself, became a fightable NPC in EpicDuel, ArtixEntertainment's PvP MMO.

Lowe has done voice-over work for various media outlets and other companies. For example, San Francisco Bay Area active rock station KSAN uses Lowe's voice in station identification spots. Lowe also has done voiceovers for Cleveland rock station WNCX, the Fox, FX, and FXX television networks, and commercials for Dunkin' Donuts and Capital One. George Lowe also played a small role in the animated series Beetlejuice as Super Ego in the episode "Super Zeros".

Recently Lowe is one of the guests in events in the MMORPG AdventureQuest Worlds, mostly voicing his own lines along with any other guest, as well as voicing the Internet advertising for the game.

Lowe has done announcing work for Sponsors vs. Freeloaders from the second episode forward, and is the announcer for The B.S. of A. with Brian Sack.

Lowe can be heard introducing and closing each episode of Adult Swim Central Central Presents Colon Adult Swim Swimcast Intended for the Internet.

Filmography

Film

Television

Video games

References
Notes

External links
 
 
 Nerds in Hell Podcast Interview (8/1/14)
 George Lowe Audio Interview

1957 births
Living people
American male video game actors
American male voice actors
Radio personalities from Atlanta
People from Lakeland, Florida
People from Dunedin, Florida
People from Brooksville, Florida
Actors from Pinellas County, Florida
20th-century American male actors
21st-century American male actors
Male actors from Florida
American male web series actors
Television personalities from Florida